Église d'Auteuil (literally "Auteuil Church") is a station of the Paris Métro in the 16th arrondissement, serving Line 10 (westbound service only). With around 172,812 passenger entrances in 2016, it is the least-entered station on the Paris Métro network. However, because this station serves westbound passengers only, and the RATP only records station entrances and not exits, it is possible that more passengers exit at Église d'Auteuil than enter.

Location
There are two access points: both an entrance and exit are available at the Place de Théodore Rivière, while an exit exists on Rue Wilhem at its intersection with Avenue Théophile Gautier.

Église d'Auteuil is located very close to Mirabeau station; the two stations can be considered twins, with Église d'Auteuil serving westbound traffic and Mirabeau serving eastbound traffic, but they each have separate entrances and exits.

History
The station opened on 30 September 1913 as part of the extension of line 8 from Beaugrenelle (now Charles Michels) to Porte d'Auteuil. On 29 July 1937, line 10 was extended from Duroc to La Motte-Picquet - Grenelle and the section of line 8 between La Motte-Picquet - Grenelle and Porte d'Auteuil, including Église d'Auteuil, was transferred to line 10.

This station was named Wilhem until 15 May 1921. Wilhem was the pseudonym of a French musician, Guillaume Louis Bocquillon Wilhem. However, a municipal councillor became convinced that the station was actually named for Kaiser Wilhelm II of Germany, so it was renamed following World War I after a nearby church, Notre-Dame-d'Auteuil.

Station layout

Gallery

References
Roland, Gérard (2003). Stations de métro. D’Abbesses à Wagram. Éditions Bonneton.

Notes

Paris Métro stations in the 16th arrondissement of Paris
Railway stations in France opened in 1913